William Penn High School, also known as High Point Normal & Industrial Institute, is a historic high school for African-American students located at High Point, Guilford County, North Carolina. The high school building was built in 1910–1911, and enlarged and renovated in 1929–1930.  It is a two-story, 12 classroom Colonial Revival style brick building. It has a projecting three-bay entrance pavilion. Two other buildings associated with the High Point Normal & Industrial Institute are on the property. The Institute was established by Quakers in 1891.  They were built about 1910 and are a gable end frame structure sheathed in corrugated metal with a distinctive monitor roof and a brick building with a low pitched roof. The school closed in 1968 and was re-opened in 2003 as an arts magnet high school, Penn-Griffin School for the Arts.

It was listed on the National Register of Historic Places in 1978.

Notable alumni 
 John Coltrane — jazz saxophonist and composer
 Gwendolyn Ann Magee — African American fiber artist

References 

African-American history of North Carolina
Buildings and structures in High Point, North Carolina
High schools in North Carolina
School buildings on the National Register of Historic Places in North Carolina
Colonial Revival architecture in North Carolina
School buildings completed in 1911
Schools in Guilford County, North Carolina
National Register of Historic Places in Guilford County, North Carolina
1911 establishments in North Carolina